Mykines, known before 1916 as Charvati, is a village and a former municipality in Argolis, Peloponnese, Greece. Since the 2011 local government reform it is part of the municipality Argos-Mykines, of which it is a municipal unit. The municipal unit has an area of 159.033 km2. It is located 1 km west of the ancient site of Mycenae and 2 km east of the highway linking Argos and Corinth. It is 9 km north of Argos.

Name
The name Mykines is the modern Greek version of Mycenae. The village is near the archaeological site of Mycenae.

Historical population

References 

Populated places in Argolis